Lake Văcărești is a lake in the south of Bucharest, Sector 4. It is now part of the Văcărești Nature Park, a protected zone of nature. Over 100 species of wild birds and animals live in this area. The area is nicknamed Bucharest Delta.

History
The lake was formed from an old bifurcation of the Dâmbovița River and was previously known as Balta Văcărești.

On June 5, 2014, the Lake Văcărești zone was declared protected zone and named Natural Park Văcărești by the Government of Romania.

See also
List of lakes in Bucharest

References

Vacaresti